The 2008 UNAF Women's Club Tournament is the 2nd edition of the UNAF Women's Club Tournament. The clubs from Algeria, Egypt and Tunisia faced off for the title. The Algerian team ASE Alger Centre wins the tournament.

Teams
Wadi Degla was chosen by the Egyptian Football Association as an Egyptian representative, the Egyptian Women's Premier League was cancelled since the 2002–03 season.

Tournament
The competition played in a round-robin tournament determined the final standings. It's hosted in Algiers, Algeria.

References

External links
2éme Coupe des Clubs Champions Féminin de l'Union Nord Africaine - ASE AC official website

UNAF Women's Club Tournament
2008 in African football